Maly Ovinets is a rural locality (a village) in Sizemskoye Rural Settlement, Sheksninsky District, Vologda Oblast, Russia. The population was 24 as of 2002.

Geography 
Maly Ovinets is located 66 km north of Sheksna (the district's administrative centre) by road. Polyana is the nearest rural locality.

References 

Rural localities in Sheksninsky District